Arthur Bayley (28 March 1865 – 29 October 1896) was a gold prospector who discovered gold at Fly Flat, Western Australia on 17 September 1892, around which the town of Coolgardie grew.

Early life
Bayley was born in Newbridge, Victoria, son of John Bayley, a butcher, and his wife Rosanna. 
When only 16 years of age he went to North Queensland and did prospecting and mining work at Charters Towers, Hughenden, Normanton, Croydon and Palmer. He then went to Western Australia and landed at Fremantle with about thirty shillings in his pocket.

Prospecting in Western Australia
Bayley kept this in mind and determined some day to prospect the area himself. In January 1889 he went to the Nullagine diggings and Roebourne in the Pilbara. He had some success, and after returning to Perth, returned to Southern Cross.

Hearing that gold had been found on the Ashburton, Bayley returned to the north and found good gold at Ford's Creek. While prospecting the Murchison River he found Bayley's Island in Lake Austin which also yielded good returns.

Back at Southern Cross in mid-1892, Bayley encountered a prospector he had met previously in Queensland, William Ford, who had also heard of gold being found to the east. In June, the two men set out from Southern Cross with five horses to find it. After more rich alluvial gold was found, the two men were compelled to return to Southern Cross for supplies. On returning to the field a quartz outcrop with gold in it was found, which became the famous Bayley's Reward mine.

There was a tremendous rush to the field from Southern Cross, much gold was found, and in a few years Coolgardie was a thriving town. Bayley's reward claim proved to be a very profitable one indeed, and was continually worked until 1963.

Late life
Bayley and Ford sold their claim to a company for £6000 and a sixth interest and Bayley, having returned to Victoria, took up land near Avenel, and lived in prosperous circumstances. Though a strong athletic man he fell into ill health, possibly on account of privations he had suffered while a prospector, and died at Avenel of congestion of the lungs on 29 October 1896. He left a widow but no children.

Notes

References

External links
Pat Simpson, 'Bayley, Arthur Wellesley (1865 - 1896)', Australian Dictionary of Biography, Volume 7, MUP, 1979, pp 220–221.

Gold prospectors
Australian gold prospectors
1865 births
1896 deaths
People from Victoria (Australia)